Kean is a 1921 German silent historical film directed by Rudolf Biebrach and starring Heinrich George and Carola Toelle. It is an adaptation of the 1836 play Kean by Alexandre Dumas.

The film's sets were designed by the art director Ludwig Kainer and Hans Sohnle.

Cast

References

Bibliography

External links

1921 films
1920s historical films
German historical films
Films of the Weimar Republic
Films directed by Rudolf Biebrach
Films based on works by Alexandre Dumas
German films based on plays
German silent feature films
German black-and-white films
Films set in London
Films set in the 19th century
Films about actors
UFA GmbH films
1920s German films